Berosus pugnax is a species of hydrophilid beetles native to the United States. It was originally described by John Lawrence LeConte in 1863 and is characterized by having emarginate apices on its elytra.

References

Hydrophilinae
Beetles described in 1863